Yot or YOT may refer to:

Short I (Й й), a letter of the Cyrillic alphabet
Yot (letter), an alternate name for the letter J j in context of Greek script
Yotvata Airfield in Israel (IATA Code: YOT)
Youth Offending Team (YOT), in England and Wales, that monitors young offenders
Youth of Today, a youth crew/hardcore punk band from Connecticut
Yotti language (ISO 639-3 code: yot)
Yot, Song Khwae, Nan Province, Thailand

See also
Yacht, recreational boat
Yeot, Hangwa variety in McCune–Reischauer romanisation